Stictoleptura canadensis, commonly known as the Red-shouldered Pine Borer, is a species of beetle in the family Cerambycidae found in Canada and the United States.

Habitat

Larvae
The larvae feed on dead, or decaying wood, but sometimes use a living plant as a host. Girdlers eat living branches or twigs. The larvae move freely through the soil, feeding upon roots, or tunneling under the root crown.

Adult
The adults feed on flowers. Every adult have different feeding requirement, some may like sap, while others, may prefer bark, leaves, blossoms, fruits, or fungi. Some even drink water only. In a temperate climate, the species life span, as a larva, is 1–3 years. However, cycles of 2–3 months, even decades have been recorded. Adult beetles quickly emerge, later disperse, following by reproduction, and death, all which takes from 3 days to couple of months.

References

Stictoleptura
Beetles described in 1795
Beetles of North America